Moldova competed at the 2014 Summer Youth Olympics, in Nanjing, China from 16 August to 28 August 2014.

Medalists

Athletics

Moldova qualified two athletes.

Qualification Legend: Q=Final A (medal); qB=Final B (non-medal); qC=Final C (non-medal); qD=Final D (non-medal); qE=Final E (non-medal)

Boys
Field Events

Girls
Field events

Canoeing

Moldova qualified one boat based on its performance at the 2013 World Junior Canoe Sprint and Slalom Championships.

Boys

Gymnastics

Rhythmic Gymnastics

Moldova qualified one athlete based on its performance at the 2014 Rhythmic Gymnastics Grand Prix in Moscow.

Individual

Shooting

Moldova was given a wild card to compete.

Individual

Team

Swimming

Moldova qualified three swimmers.

Boys

Girls

Wrestling

Moldova qualified three athletes based on its performance at the 2014 European Cadet Championships.

Boys

Girls

References

2014 in Moldova
Nations at the 2014 Summer Youth Olympics
Moldova at the Youth Olympics